Glauert's froglet, rattling froglet or clicking froglet (Crinia glauerti) is a species of frog in the family Myobatrachidae.
It is endemic to Australia.
Its natural habitats are temperate forests, rivers, intermittent rivers, shrub-dominated wetlands, swamps, freshwater lakes, freshwater marshes, arable land, pastureland, plantations, rural gardens, water storage areas, ponds, open excavations, sewage treatment areas, and introduced vegetation.
It is threatened by habitat loss.

References

Crinia
Amphibians of Western Australia
Taxonomy articles created by Polbot
Amphibians described in 1933
Frogs of Australia